The Loganville and Lawrenceville Railroad (L&L) was founded in 1898 and operated a  line between Loganville and Lawrenceville, Georgia, USA.  It was owned by the Georgia, Carolina and Northern Railway which was incorporated into the Seaboard Air Line Railway on 1 July 1900.  The L&L was completely abandoned on 17 January 1932. The tracks were removed in 1933.

The 10.33 mile run departed Loganville at 7:30am arriving at 8:10am, and depared again at 5:20pm arriving at 6pm. The return trips were from Lawrenceville 9:25am, arriving at 10:05, and departing 6:35pm arriving at 7:15pm. There was no turntable for the engine in Loganville, so it was turned around using a Y track.

References 

Defunct Georgia (U.S. state) railroads
Railway companies established in 1898
Railway companies disestablished in 1902
Predecessors of the Seaboard Air Line Railroad